Abraham Vereide (October 7, 1886 – May 16, 1969) was a Norwegian-born American Methodist minister and founder of International Christian Leadership (ICL) group.

Early life 
Abraham was born in the Vereide home in Gloppen in the Nordfjord district of Norway on October 7, 1886 to Anders and Helene Vereide. He was the youngest and had four older sisters. Helene died when Abraham was eight years old.

Career 
In 1905 Vereide received a ticket to the United States from a neighbor who was unable to use it. He traveled to Montana and found menial work. Later, he studied at a seminary in Evanston, Indiana. He married Mattie Hansen in 1910.

Vereide was first assigned to Spokane, Washington by the Methodist church. He was later assigned to Portland, Oregon and Seattle in 1916. During these years, he and Mattie had one daughter, Alicia, and three sons, Warren, Milton, and Abraham. The family moved to Boston, Massachusetts in 1931. On personal invitation from then-Governor Franklin D. Roosevelt, he attended a conference regarding the social relief program for New York.

In 1935, Vereide founded the prayer breakfast movement in the United States, which served as the basis for the yearly National Prayer Breakfast. In 1944, International Christian Leadership began in Washington, D.C. Vereide was the executive director of this organization until his death in 1969. He was part of a peace conference in San Francisco after World War II. In 1953, Vereide and the fellowship started the Presidential Prayer Breakfast, later called the National Prayer Breakfast or the International Prayer Breakfast. He was editor for "The Christian Citizen" together with Capt. Leonard Larsen.

Personal life 
Around 1905, at a tent meeting that came to town, he found fellowship and met his future wife, Mattie Hansen, the daughter of a Danish pastor.

Vereide died in Silver Spring, Maryland on May 16, 1969.

References

1886 births
1969 deaths
People from Gloppen
American Methodists
Norwegian emigrants to the United States
20th-century Methodist ministers